Larne Football Club is a professional Northern Irish football club based in Larne, County Antrim that play in the NIFL Premiership.

History
The club was founded in 1889 and plays its home matches at Inver Park. The club's colours are red and white, and the club's greatest rivals are Ballyclare Comrades and Carrick Rangers; their matches are known as "The East Antrim Derby". From 1972 until 2008, the club had senior status, but reverted to intermediate status when it failed to gain a place in the new IFA Premiership. The club regained senior status in 2016, when the NIFL Championship became the second tier of senior football for the 2016–17 season.

Larne have notably been runners-up of the Irish Cup on six occasions (1928, 1935, 1987, 1989, 2005 and 2021) and runners-up of the League Cup twice (1991–92 and 2003–04) without ever winning either Cup - a record in both respective competitions for the most final appearances without ever winning.

After being taken over by Purplebricks co-founder Kenny Bruce in October 2018, the club lifted the 2018–19 NIFL Championship title. This was the club's first ever senior tier league title, their first league title since an intermediate title win in 1972, and the first senior honour since lifting the Ulster Cup in 1988. This secured a return to the top flight for the first time since suffering relegation to the second tier in the 2007–08 season after failing to meet the criteria for the new IFA Premiership.

They also field a women's team, whose colours are red & white (home) and purple & black (away). Formed by a small committee of parents and friends of the Larne Colts in November 2004, they made history by being the first ladies' team to play at Windsor Park as part of the half-time entertainment during the Irish Cup final in May 2005. The ladies also have a junior team for ages 8–14. The Senior Ladies' team has recently been reincorporated back into the club. In their inaugural season (2018), they finished the season as the unbeaten North 2 League Champions, and also as beaten finalists in the North 2 League Cup. They now play in the top tier (NIFL Women's Premiership) of the Northern Ireland Women's football league system after 4 consecutive promotions.

Current squad

Out on loan

Non-playing staff

European record

Overview

Matches

UEFA ranking

Honours

Senior honours
County Antrim Shield: 3
2020–21, 2021–22, 2022–23
NIFL Championship: 1
2018–19
Ulster Cup: 2
1949–50, 1987–88

Intermediate honours
Irish League B Division: 10
1954–55, 1956–57, 1963–64, 1964–65, 1965–66, 1966–67, 1968–69, 1969–70, 1970–71, 1971–72
Irish Intermediate League: 1
1952–53
Irish Intermediate Cup: 3
1942–43†, 1958–59, 1969–70
George Wilson Cup: 6
1958–59, 1959–60, 1968–69, 1970–71, 1977–78†, 1978–79†
Steel & Sons Cup: 11
1909–10, 1941–42†, 1942–43†, 1956–57, 1958–59, 1959–60, 1964–65, 1968–69, 1969–70, 1970–71, 1971–72
Louis Moore Cup: 2
1956–57 (shared with Banbridge Town), 1958–59
 McElroy Cup: 1
1948–49

† Won by Larne Olympic (reserve team)

Junior honours
Irish Junior Cup: 1
1900–01

References

External links
 Larne FC Website
 Larne FC Official Twitter

 
Association football clubs established in 1889
Association football clubs in Northern Ireland
Larne
NIFL Championship clubs
Association football clubs in County Antrim
1889 establishments in Ireland